This is a list of countries by order of appearance in the Fragile States Index (formerly the Failed States Index) of the United States think tank Fund for Peace.

A fragile state has several attributes. Common indicators include a state whose central government is so weak or ineffective that it has little practical control over much of its territory; non-provision of public services; widespread corruption and criminality; refugees and involuntary movement of populations; and sharp economic decline. Since 2005, the index has been published annually by the Fund for Peace and the magazine Foreign Policy. The list has been cited by journalists and academics in making broad comparative points about countries or regions.

The report uses 12 factors to determine the rating for each nation, including security threats, economic implosion, human rights violations and refugee flows.

Indicators of a fragile state
Fund For Peace ranks (between 0 and 10) the following factors to determine the overall status of a country on the index. 

Cohesion
Security apparatus
Factionalized elites
Group grievance
Economic
Economic decline and poverty
Uneven development
Human flight and brain drain
Political
State legitimacy
Public services
Human rights and rule of law
Social
Demographic pressures
Refugees and internally displaced persons
Cross-cutting
External intervention

Fragile States Index 2022
The table below shows the FSI for 2022, with comparisons of each country's current score to previous years' indices. A higher score (with a maximum of 120) indicates a weaker, more vulnerable, or more fragile situation in the country.

References

External links

Fragile States Index
Fragile States Index